Delta Delta Delta, also known as Tri Delta, is an international women's fraternity founded on November 27, 1888 at Boston University by Sarah Ida Shaw, Eleanor Dorcas Pond, Isabel Morgan Breed, and Florence Isabelle Stewart.

Tri Delta partnered with St. Jude Children's Research Hospital in 1999 as the first non-corporation partner to be named the St. Jude partner of the year. With over 200,000 living initiates, Tri Delta is one of the largest National Panhellenic Conference sororities.

History
'The founders of ΔΔΔ:

Delta Delta Delta was founded by Sarah Ida Shaw, Eleanor Dorcas Pond, Florence Isabelle Stewart, and Isabel Morgan Breed at Boston University. Three women's fraternities were already represented at Boston University in 1888 (Kappa Kappa Gamma, Gamma Phi Beta, and Alpha Phi). Shaw enlisted the help of Eleanor Dorcas Pond and told her, "Let us found a society that shall be kind alike to all and think more of a girl's inner self and character than of her personal appearance."

The two young women began the work of creating a new national fraternity. Later Sarah wrote "...The two enthusiastic friends were unaware of the fact that there was something stupendous about the task they had set hands, heads and hearts to accomplish. They were working for a principle, and it never occurred to them that there could be such a thing as failure. Earnestness of purpose, energy and enthusiasm had brought them both success in college and why should not these same qualities bring assurance of good fortune to the new venture."

Shaw and Pond wrote the rituals and constitution and designed the emblems. Choosing the name was a mutual decision. Pond suggested a triple letter while Shaw chose the actual letter and developed Greek mottos and passwords. Inspiration came from Egyptian Lore, Hindu mysticism, Greek Mythology and Astronomy, reflecting Shaw's wide and various interests.

In the 1960s, G. William Domhoff, writing in Who Rules America?, listed Tri Delta as one of "the four or five sororities with nationwide prestige."

Symbols

The Greek alphabet letters Delta Delta Delta (ΔΔΔ) are the official symbols. The dolphin is recognized as an additional symbol as it was considered to be a good omen by the ancient Greeks. The colors of Tri Delta are silver, gold, and cerulean blue, while the pearl is its jewel. The sorority recognizes the pansy as its official flower and the pine tree as its official tree.

The coat of arms consists of a quartered shield, first and fourth quarters in blue with a silver trident on each, second and third quarters in gold with green pine tree on each. The sorority crest is placed above the shield and consists of a torse with six folds in alternating gold and blue, from which a white, gold and blue pansy rises. Below the shield, the Greek motto Asfalos Agapomen Allaylas ("Let us steadfastly love one another") is inscribed in Greek characters on a scroll.

Official insignia
Tri Delta's official badge is the Stars and Crescent, consisting of three golden stars and a crown set with pearls, within a gold crescent of three hundred degrees bearing three deltas in black enamel. An initiate receives a badge with her initials, the Greek letters of her chapter, and her chapter Initiation number engraved on the back. The badge belongs to the sorority and is "lent" to each member during her lifetime or as long as she remains a member, with the expectation that the badge will be returned upon the member's death or resignation.

Prior to initiation, new members wear a new member pin, which is a green and silver enamel badge described as an "inverted Delta surrounded by three Deltas." A new member may also display a trident, which symbolizes the first degree of initiation and is returned prior to initiation into the Stars and Crescent degree. A gold trident may be worn as a badge guard.

Tri Delta also has various circle pins to celebrate years since the member's initiation. Introduced in 2004, the Silver Circle Pin may be worn by members who have reached the 25-year anniversary of their initiation. It features the anniversary number engraved on the stars and crescent design. The Golden Circle Pin was originally created by Sarah Ida Shaw for the Circle Degree of Initiation, but its current usage to celebrate 50 years since initiation dates to 1962. This pin consists of three deltas made of gold inside a golden circle, surrounded by six spherical triangles in blue. The Diamond Circle Pin honors members who have served for 75 years with the fraternity. While the design is alike to the Golden Circle Pin, this token features a diamond in the center. This pin was introduced in the year 1996 and the first pin was awarded to Mary K. Wise of Butler University.

Programs
Philanthropy
Many chapters observe "Sleighbell Day" on the first Tuesday of December, following the tradition of Sleighbell Luncheon, first held in the 1940s by 13 Southern California chapters to benefit a doctor researching blood diseases at Children's Hospital Los Angeles. In the early 1970s, a national survey established that Tri Delta chapters were interested in children, hospitals, and cancer. At the 1974 Tri Delta Convention, the three were combined to support children's cancer charities as the designated philanthropy.

In 1999, Tri Delta partnered with St. Jude Children's Research Hospital. St. Jude (through the fundraising branch, the American Lebanese Syrian Associated Charities) assists Tri Delta chapters in planning philanthropy events that benefit the children and subsidize research costs at St. Jude. Many chapters coordinate fundraising activities such as pancake breakfasts, called Delta House of Pancakes or DHOP,  and football tailgates on their campuses each year. Since 1999, Tri Delta has raised more than $30 million for St. Jude. In 2002, Tri Deltas committed to raising $1 million to build a Teen Room at the St. Jude Hospital in Memphis, Tennessee, fulfilling the commitment in 2005. In July 2006, Tri Delta committed to raise $10 million in 10 years to build a new patient treatment floor focusing on brain tumor research at St. Jude, instead raising $10.4 million in 4 years. In 2010, a new philanthropic goal was announced to raise $15 million in 5 years. On February 1, 2014, it was announced that Tri Delta surpassed the $15 million goal in just 3.5 years. On July 4, 2014, Tri Delta announced a new philanthropic goal to raise $60 million over 10 years, the largest single commitment by a partner of St. Jude in the history of the hospital.  Only three-and-a-half years into the 10 year commitment to raise $60 million, Tri Delta hit the halfway point and announced $30 million raised for St. Jude in January 2018. Their pledge funded the Tri Delta Place, St. Jude's only on-campus housing facility. It includes 64 hotel-style rooms and 36 suites. Tri Delta was also named the St. Jude partner of the year for 2014, making Tri Delta the first non-corporation to receive this honor. As of February 2018, Tri Delta has reached the halfway point of this commitment. Since 1999, Tri Delta members have raised more than $70 million to St. Jude. Tri delta continues every year to increase their philanthropy goals for St. Jude.

In addition to the national partnership, Tri Delta continues to raise money for local Children's Cancer Charities, including two Canadian Hospitals, the Hospital for Sick Children in Toronto, Canada, the Children's Hospital of Eastern Ontario in Ottawa, Canada, and local children's cancer charities in various states.

Every year, chapters host a variety of events to raise money for these causes. This includes sporting events such as Greeks at Bat (an inter-fraternity baseball tournament) and Tri Delta Triple Play (kickball tournament), pancake breakfasts commonly named "Delta House of Pancakes," "Delta Diner," or "TriHOP", and spaghetti dinners. Every Tri Delta member also participates in "Sincerely Yours", an international writing campaign to raise money for St Jude. Other St. Jude specific philanthropic endeavors includes a Gold Level National Team participation in the St. Jude Walk/Run to End Childhood Cancer.

The TridentThe Trident'' is Tri Delta's official publication, published continuously since 1891. The publication includes news about collegiate and alumni members, chapter events, topics in women's health, editorials, and upcoming events.

Chapters

Membership

Leadership
Active members of each Tri Delta chapter may join a committee or be slated into an office in order to serve the organization and develop leadership skills. During the slating process, members adhere to the mantra "The Office Selects the Officer,” and undergo the process of determining the officer that is best suited for each office based on her skills and previous experience.

Each collegiate chapter president oversees chapter business, including membership in every team and committee. Each subsequent office is organized into one of the following teams, each headed by a Vice-President: Administration, Chapter Development, Finance, Public Relations, and Membership. Further committees, assistants, and chair-positions are tailored to each chapter's specific needs. A new officer structure was introduced in 2020 which consists of the collegiate chapter president and Vice Presidents of Operations, Chapter Programming and Development, Community Relations, and Membership Experience. Each officer team consists of one VP and a set of directors.

Chapter Development Consultants
Since 1910, Tri Delta has utilized a consultant program, in which recently graduated alumna members are trained and employed by the executive office to visit chapters to provide resources and advice on their chapter business. Chapter Development Consultants provide constructive feedback in order to align the chapter with standards determined by the executive office. Consultants have gone by many names over the years, including field secretaries and field consultants. In 2015, the name was changed to Chapter Development Consultants.

Alumnae involvement
After graduation, alumnae may continue to support Tri Delta and stay active within the Greek community via means such as joining an alumna chapter, attending and hosting philanthropy events, donating to the Tri Delta Foundation's scholarships, contributing to The Trident, writing reference letters for potential new members, and volunteering. Alumnae who wish to stay connected to or make a more direct contribution to a specific collegiate chapter may join its alumna advisory team. Members volunteering on an international level include members of the National Housing Corporation, who manage fraternity properties, and members of the Foundation.

Notable members

Local chapter and individual misconduct

Southern chapters
In 2011, the chapter at the University of South Carolina was placed on probation after a party they hosted resulted in 31 citations for underage drinking. The sorority was forced to temporarily suspend all social activities as a result.

In 2013 and 2014, sorority women from multiple chapters at the University of Alabama – including Delta Delta Delta, Pi Beta Phi, Chi Omega, Kappa Delta, Alpha Gamma Delta, Alpha Omicron Pi, and Phi Mu – alleged that either active members or some of their alumnae had prevented them from offering membership to black candidates because of their race. An anonymous Delta Delta Delta member spoke to the school newspaper, The Crimson White, stating: "To my knowledge, the president and the rush chair and our rush advisors [supported recruiting a black candidate], and if we had been able to pledge her, it would’ve been an honor. However, our [alumnae] stepped in and went over us and had her dropped. The only thing that kept her back was the color of her skin in Tri Delt. She would have been a dog fight between all the sororities if she were white.” Students held a campus march to integrate Greek life on campus, and following media and national outcry, the university held a second round of recruitment in hopes of offering membership to more women, including black women.

In 2015, the chapter at the University of West Georgia was shut down for violating the university's policy and code of conduct. Serious allegations of hazing were charged against women of the sorority, and the Tri Delta executive board refused to release specific details of the investigation.

Midwest chapters
In 2009, the chapter at Miami University was suspended for hazing. Pledges were blindfolded and taken off-campus, where they were given an excessive amount of alcohol, causing some women to need medical attention after the incident.

In 2017, the chapter at Indiana University was shut down following an investigation which found that chapter members were "involved in activities that do not represent our high standards or align with Tri Delta's purpose." Chapter members also "violated the chapter's previous probation terms." The national organization declined to specify further, but noted that the chapter had "been on probation for three consecutive semesters, and each time was asked to take responsibility for their actions. Each time ... the chapter chose to ignore advice and recommendations, sending a strong message that they had no intention of making positive change."

On January 20, 2019, a member of Tri Delta sorority at the University of Oklahoma was removed from the organization after posting a video in which her friend appears wearing blackface and saying a racial slur.

Eastern state school chapters
In 2009, the chapter at Pennsylvania State University was shut down due to hazing and endangering new pledges. The Tri Delta national organization refused to release specific details about the investigation.

See also
List of social fraternities and sororities

References

External links
Tri Delta National Web Site
Reflections: Body Image Program Web site
Image of USC Tri-Delta Sorority member passing through ring at 42nd annual Pansy Ring Ceremony, 1965. Los Angeles Times Photographic Archive (Collection 1429). UCLA Library Special Collections, Charles E. Young Research Library, University of California, Los Angeles.

1888 establishments in Massachusetts
Boston University
National Panhellenic Conference
Student organizations established in 1888
Student societies in the United States
Women's organizations based in the United States